Hohe Warte may refer to the following geographical locations:

In Germany:
 Hohe Warte (ridge), a forested upland in the Fichtel Mountains of North Bavaria
 Hohe Warte (Fichtelgebirge), a hill in the Fichtel Mountains
 Hohe Warte (Schwäbische Alb), a mountain in the Swabian Jura
 2 mountains in the Thuringian Forest, in Ilm district:
 Hohe Warte (Elgersburg) (765 m) southwest of Elgersburg
 Hohe Warte (Frankenhain) (776 m) northeast of Oberhof on the Frankenhainer Gemarkung
 Hohe Warte (Rothaargebirge), a mountain in the Rothaar Mountains
 Hohe Warte (Spessart), a hill in the Spessart
 Hohe Warte (Odenwald), a hill in the Odenwald
 Hohe Warte (Eifel), a mountain in the Eifel
 Hohe Warte (Gießen), forested heights east of Gießen
 a district of Stuttgart-Feuerbach in Stuttgart
 an observation tower in Pforzheim, see Hohe Warte (Pforzheim)
 Hohe Warte (Engelskirchen), a mountain near Engelskirchen in the Oberbergischen Kreis

In Austria:
 Hohe Warte, Vienna, a hill in the 19th Vienna parish of (Döbling)
 Hohe Warte (Carnic Alps), a mountain on the border of Carinthia and Italy
 Hohe Warte (Zillertal Alps), a mountain in the Zillertal Alps
 Hohe Warte (Karwendel), a mountain in the Karwendel, Tyrol
 Hohe Warte (Tux Alps), a mountain in the Tux Alps, Tyrol
 the old name for a hill in the 18th Vienna parish, see Türkenschanze

as well as:
 Hohe Warte Casino Stadium, a stadium in Vienna

See also 
Hohe Wart, a mountain in Bavaria's Spessart hills
Hohenwarth, Hohenwart, Hohe Wart Tunnel
Hohenwarte
Hohenwarthe